The Buru golden bulbul (Hypsipetes mysticalis) is a species of songbird in the bulbul family. It is endemic to Buru Island. Its natural habitat is subtropical or tropical moist lowland forests.

Taxonomy and systematics
The Buru golden bulbul was originally classified in the genus Criniger, and has also been classified in the genus  Alophoixus. Until recently, it was considered conspecific with the Seram golden bulbul and the northern golden bulbul.

References

Rheindt, F.E., and R.O. Hutchinson. 2007. A photoshot odyssey through the confused avian taxonomy of Seram and Buru (southern Moluccas). BirdingASIA 7: 18–38.

Buru golden bulbul
Birds of Buru
Buru golden bulbul